Eyre is a suburb of Adelaide in the City of Playford. It was created on 31 October 2017 by cutting off the northeastern corner of what had been the suburb of Penfield. Its boundaries are Womma, Stebonheath and Petherton Roads on the south, east and north sides. The west follows Andrews Road north from Womma Road, but then extends west to the Northern Expressway.

History
On 31 October 2017, this section was excised from Penfield and the new suburb of Eyre was created on the north side of Womma Road and western side of Stebonheath Road. The eastern side was dominated by a housing estate which had been marketed as "Eyre at Penfield". The northeastern corner was the site of a local shopping centre to open later in 2017 including a Drake's Foodland.

References

Suburbs of Adelaide